Cullin-7 is a RING-E3 ligase protein that in humans is encoded by the CUL7 gene.

Clinical significance 
It is associated with 3-M syndrome.

Interactions
CUL7 has been shown to interact with RBX1.

References

Further reading

External links
  GeneReviews/NIH/NCBI/UW entry on 3-M syndrome
  OMIM entries entry on 3-M syndrome